Vinícius Silva Lopes Souto (born 29 January 1988), or simply Vinícius Lopes, is a Brazilian professional footballer who plays for Al-Hamriyah as striker .

Career
Lopes began his career at Brazilian club Cruzeiro. In January 2008, he left his homeland and moved to Swedish club BK Häcken, where he spent 3 seasons and scored 8 goals in 48 games. On 20 February 2011, Lopes moved to South Korean K-League side Gwangju FC.

In July 2011, Lopes moved to Kuwaiti Premier League side Al Jahra.

References

External links 
 
 
 
 

1988 births
Living people
Brazilian footballers
Brazilian expatriate footballers
BK Häcken players
Gwangju FC players
K League 1 players
Al Urooba Club players
Dibba Al-Hisn Sports Club players
Dibba FC players
Al-Arabi SC (UAE) players
Al Hamriyah Club players
Brazilian expatriate sportspeople in South Korea
Expatriate footballers in Sweden
Expatriate footballers in South Korea
Expatriate footballers in Kuwait
Expatriate footballers in Qatar
Expatriate footballers in the United Arab Emirates
Muaither SC players
Association football forwards
Allsvenskan players
UAE First Division League players
Qatari Second Division players
Al Jahra SC players
Kuwait SC players
Brazilian expatriate sportspeople in Kuwait
Brazilian expatriate sportspeople in the United Arab Emirates
Brazilian expatriate sportspeople in Sweden
Brazilian expatriate sportspeople in Qatar
Kuwait Premier League players
Footballers from Brasília